The blue antimora (Antimora rostrata), also known as the flat-nose codling, blue hake, long-finned cod  or violet cod, is a benthopelagic species of morid cod of the genus Antimora, found in seas around the world on the continental shelf except the north Pacific. This bluish-black species may be found at depths of between 350 and 3,000 m(1,148 to 9.843 ft), but it is commonly found at depths of 800-1800m. Its length is between 40 and 75 cm (15.7 to 29.5 inches). It is of minor importance to commercial fisheries.

References

 Tony Ayling & Geoffrey Cox, Collins Guide to the Sea Fishes of New Zealand,  (William Collins Publishers Ltd, Auckland, New Zealand 1982) 

blue antimora
Cosmopolitan fish
blue antimora
blue antimora